An apostle spoon is a spoon (usually silver or silver-plated, but sometimes of other metals, such as pewter) with an image of an apostle or other saint as the terminal of the handle, each bearing his distinctive emblem. Apostle spoons were particularly popular prior to the Reformation. They symbolize the Last Supper of Christ in the company of the Apostles. Apostle spoons were especially popular in England, but were also found in large numbers in Germany.

Origins
Originating in early-fifteenth century in Europe as spoons used at table (often produced in sets of thirteen, the thirteenth, showing Jesus, usually being referred to as the 'Saviour' or 'Master' spoon). The British Museum in London has a set from England dating from 1536–7 which has a figure of the Virgin Mary on the thirteenth spoon. By the sixteenth century they had become popular as baptismal presents for godchildren, but were dying out by the 1660s.  In some communities this tradition continued until at least the mid-twentieth century.

They first appeared as a bequest in the will of one Amy Brent who, in 1516,  bequeathed "XIII sylver spones of J' hu and the XII Apostells." They are alluded to by the dramatists Ben Jonson, Thomas Middleton, Francis Beaumont, and John Fletcher. Shakespeare refers to it in Henry VIII, Act 5, Scene 3, where Cranmer declines to be sponsor for the infant Elizabeth because of his lack of money. King Henry banters him with "Come, come, my lord, you'ld spare your spoons." 

Sets of the twelve apostles are not common, and complete sets of thirteen, with the figure of Jesus on a larger spoon, are still rarer.

The spoon shown opposite is typical of single spoons not part of a set.  In this case the apostle is simply holding what appears to be a book. Such examples would typically be in electroplated nickel silver and marked on the rear face with "EPNS."

Attributes
The identity of the Apostle can be known by the attribute mentioned in the following list:

1 the Master: cross and orb 
2 Saint Peter: a sword or a key, sometimes a fish
3 Saint Andrew: a cross
4 Saint James the Greater: a pilgrim's staff
5 St. John: the cup of sorrow
6 Saint Philip: a staff
7 Saint Bartholomew: a knife
8 Saint Thomas: a spar
9 Saint Matthew: an axe or halberd
10 Saint James the Lesser: a fuller's bat
11 Saint Jude: a carpenter's set square
12 Saint Simon Zealotes: a long saw
13 Judas Iscariot: a bag of money

References and sources
References

Sources:

Further reading
 Cripps, W.J. Old English Plate, 9th ed., 1906.
 Hone, William. The Everyday Book and Table Book, 1831.
 Rupert, C.G. Apostle Spoons. Oxford, 1929.

External links

Some Steps in the Evolution of the Apostle Spoon  H. D. Ellis The Burlington Magazine for Connoisseurs, Vol. 23, No. 125 (Aug., 1913), pp. 283-285+287
Apostle spoons — includes photographs

Spoons
Christian symbols